Caubian Gamay is a island of Lapu-Lapu City, Philippines. Together with the bigger uninhabited island, Caubian Daku, also called Poo, comprise the Barangay of Caubian. Both islands are located in the Danajon Bank, the only double barrier reef in the Philippines and known to be one of the richest fishing grounds in the country. It is part of the Olango Island Group. Most of the families depend on fishing and speak the Cebuano language. According to the 2020 census, the island has a population of 2,429. With an area of around 0.04km2, Caubian Gamay has an estimated population density of 60,725/km2. It is regarded to be one of the densest populated islands in the world.

Facilities
Currently, the island has an elementary school and a basketball court. Grade 7 to 12 students have to travel to the nearest high school in Olango Island. As of 2021, the barangay has no permanent barangay hall, daycare center and health center. The local officials are temporarily using a facility owned by a foundation where they do meetings and attend to their constituents. The barangay can be reached by motorized bangka through Angasil Port in Mactan or Sta. Rosa Port in Olango.

Exposure to Hazards
The island is exposed to hazards such as strong typhoons and sea level rise, which is believed to be caused by climate change. On December 16, 2021, the residents of Caubian Gamay were evacuated to Mactan before the arrival of the Category 5 tropical cyclone, Typhoon Rai, or known in the Philippines as Super Typhoon Odette.   In its aftermath, a number of houses and infrastructure were damaged and affected families were given immediate relief aid by the local government and non-government organizations.

See also
 List of islands by population density

References 

Lapu-Lapu City
Islands of the Philippines
Islands of Cebu